Tamira Paszek was the defending champion, but lost in the semifinals to Marina Erakovic.

Barbora Záhlavová-Strýcová won her maiden WTA singles title, defeating Erakovic 4–6, 6–1, 6–0 in the final.

Seeds

Draw

Finals

Top half

Bottom half

Qualifying

Seeds

Qualifiers

Qualifying draw

First qualifier

Second qualifier

Third qualifier

Fourth qualifier

References
Main Draw
Qualifying Draw

Challenge Bell
Tournoi de Québec
Can